Walrus/Groon is a collaborative 12" EP between the Japanese experimental doom band Boris and Japanese noise musician Merzbow. It was first sold at the 2007 South by Southwest festival in Austin, Texas.

"Walrus" is a cover of "I Am the Walrus" by The Beatles, specifically the Spooky Tooth 1970 version. "Groon" shares its name with a King Crimson improvisational piece, but has no musical resemblance. A different version of "Groon" appears on Switching Rethorics as "Vanlla Groon",  featuring sampled drums/guitar and credited to Merzbow only. It was later compiled on Another Merzbow Records. The artwork references that of the Yes album Close to the Edge. The release was pressed on five different vinyl colors: black, yellow with green, white with green, white with yellow, and clear with green.

Track listing

Notes
Mixed & mastered at Peace Music 2004

Personnel
Boris with Merzbow
Wata – guitar, vocals
Takeshi – bass, vocals
Atsuo – drums
Masami Akita – computer
Production and visuals
Eiji Hashizume – recording
Souichirou Nakamura – mixing, mastering
FangsAnalSatan – cover
Keiko Yoshida – photography

Pressing history

References

External links
 

Collaborative albums
2007 EPs
Boris (band) EPs
Merzbow EPs
Hydra Head Records EPs